Suktabari Ekramia High Madrasah is a Co-educational Higher Secondary Madrasah (belonging class V to class XII) established in 1953. It is affiliated with West Bengal Board of Madrasah Education and West Bengal Council of Higher Secondary Education.

The madrasah offers class V to class X standard under West Bengal Board of Madrasah Education and offers class XI and class XII under West Bengal Council of Higher Secondary Education.

Students of Suktabari and its surroundings study here. The students are usually from Muslim families as well as from Hindu and other families.

See also
 Suktabari

References 

Madrasas in West Bengal
Schools in Cooch Behar district
High schools and secondary schools in West Bengal
Educational institutions established in 1953
1953 establishments in West Bengal